Princess Farah could refer to:

Princess Farah Pahlavi, daughter of Reza Pahlavi, Crown Prince of Iran.
a recurring character from the 2003 video game Prince of Persia: The Sands of Time and its sequels